The Maqām Ibrāhīm is a small square stone associated with Ibrahim (Abraham), Ismail (Ishmael) and their building of the Kaaba in what is now the Great Mosque of Mecca in the Hejazi region of Saudi Arabia. According to Islamic tradition, the imprint on the stone came from Abraham's feet.

Tradition
According to one tradition, it appeared when Ibrahim stood on the stone while building the Kaaba; when the walls became too high, Ibrahim stood on the maqām, which miraculously rose up to let him continue building and also miraculously went down in order to allow Ismail to hand him stones. Other traditions held that the footprint appeared when the wife of Ismail washed Ibrahim's head, or alternatively when Ibrahim stood atop it in order to summon the people to perform the pilgrimage to Mecca.

The stone

It used to be enclosed by a structure called the Maqsurat Ibrahim which was covered by a sitara: an ornamental, embroidered curtain that was replaced annually. Currently it is placed inside a golden-metal enclosure. The outer casing has changed a number of times over the years; historic photographs show that the arch of the Banu Shaybah Gate stood next to it.

See also
Arabian Peninsula
Holiest sites in Islam
Kaaba
Zamzam Well

References

Further reading

Islamic holy places
Religious buildings and structures in Saudi Arabia
Sacred rocks
Abraham in Islam
Masjid al-Haram